The Captain Oliver Bearse House was a historic house in the Hyannis village of Barnstable, Massachusetts.  Built c. 1841, it was a fine example of Greek Revival architecture, built for a prominent local ship's captain. The house was listed on the National Register of Historic Places in 1987. It was extensively damaged by fire in 2011, and has since been demolished.

Description and history
The Captain Oliver Bearse House stood south of Main Street in downtown Hyannis, on the west side of Pearl Street. It was a -story wood-frame structure, with corner pilasters and an entablature that wrapped around the main block. Its entry was flanked by sidelight windows and pilasters, and topped by a heavy lintel and entablature. A five-bay two-story ell extended to the left, with a separate entrance at its center.

The house was built about 1841 for Oliver Bearse. Bearse was from a family descended from one of Hyannis's early settlers, Benjamin Bearse, and both he and his brother Asa were prominent local deep-sea ship's captains. Bearse lived in this house until 1850, and it was sold out of the family in 1898. It was during the 20th century home to Gladys Bond, a longtime librarian of the local library, who died in 1959. It was thereafter converted into a lodging house. It was extensively damaged by fire in 2011, and has since been demolished.

See also
National Register of Historic Places listings in Barnstable County, Massachusetts

References

Houses in Barnstable, Massachusetts
National Register of Historic Places in Barnstable, Massachusetts
Houses on the National Register of Historic Places in Barnstable County, Massachusetts
Houses completed in 1841
Greek Revival architecture in Massachusetts